The 2011 Critérium du Dauphiné, was the 63rd running of the Critérium du Dauphiné (formerly Critérium du Dauphiné Libéré) cycling stage race. It started on 5 June in Saint-Jean-de-Maurienne and ended on 12 June in La Toussuire and consisted of eight stages, including a race-commencing prologue stage and an individual time trial, held as the third stage. It was the 15th race of the 2011 UCI World Tour season.

The race was won by  rider Bradley Wiggins, who claimed the leader's yellow and blue jersey after a strong finish on the individual time trial stage, and maintained his advantage to the end of the race.

In the race's other classifications,  rider Joaquim Rodríguez won both the King of the Mountains classification, and the green jersey for the points classification, 's Jérôme Coppel won the young rider classification, with  finishing at the head of the teams classification.

Teams
Twenty-two teams, each containing up to eight riders, started the race:

Pre-race favourites
The winner of the 2010 Critérium du Dauphiné, Janez Brajkovič, was looking to defend last year's victory, while other pre-race favourites like Tirreno–Adriatico and Tour de Romandie winner, Cadel Evans, as well as Ivan Basso, Robert Gesink, Samuel Sánchez, Alexander Vinokourov and Bradley Wiggins used the race as a trial-run for the Tour de France.

Route

Stages

Prologue
5 June 2011 – Saint-Jean-de-Maurienne,  individual time trial (ITT)

Stage 1
6 June 2011 – Albertville to Saint-Pierre-de-Chartreuse,

Stage 2
7 June 2011 – Voiron to Lyon,

Stage 3
8 June 2011 – Grenoble,  individual time trial (ITT)

Stage 4
9 June 2011 – La Motte-Servolex to Mâcon,

Stage 5
10 June 2011 – Parc des Oiseaux – Villars-les-Dombes to Les Gets,

Stage 6
11 June 2011 – Les Gets to Le Collet d'Allevard,

Stage 7
12 June 2011 – Pontcharra to La Toussuire,

Classification leadership

References

Further reading

Critérium du Dauphiné
Criterium du Dauphine
Critérium du Dauphiné
Critérium du Dauphiné